Sophie Christiane of Wolfstein (24 October 1667 – 23 August 1737) was Countess of Wolfstein by birth and Margravine of Brandenburg-Bayreuth-Kulmbach by marriage.

Early life and ancestry
Sophie Christiane was a daughter of Count Albrecht Frederick of Wolfstein-Sulzbürg (1644–1693) from his marriage to Countess Sophia Louise of Castell-Remlingen (1645–1717), daughter of Count Georg Wolfgang of Castell-Remlingen (1610–1668) and Countess Sophie Juliane of Hohenlohe-Waldenburg-Pfedelbach (1620–1682).  Sophie Christiane's maternal uncle Count Wolfgang Dietrich of Castell-Remlingen (1641–1709) was married to Countess Dorothea Renata von Zinzendorf and Pottendorf (1669–1743), an aunt of Count Nicholas Ludwig von Zinzendorf und Pottendorf (1700–1760). Due to that connection, Sophie Christiane was consequently raised strictly religiously in the Pietist manner.

Marriage
On 14 August 1687 she married Margrave Christian Heinrich, Margrave of Brandenburg-Bayreuth-Kulmbach (1661–1708), at Obersulzbürg castle.  The margrave's court at Bayreuth felt that his spouse was "not befitting" (i.e. not of high enough birth to marry a member of a ruling family), as her family acquired status of reigning Imperial Count only recently (in 1673) for immediate Lordship of Sulzbürg-Pyrbaum. In the end, after many obstacles, the marriage was recognized and treated as equal.

Later life
After the birth of their first child, the family moved into the castle at Schönberg, where Sophie Christiane, who was described as "admirable" took care of raising her children.  She composed a prayer book, the so-called Schönberger Gesangbuch, containing the prayers used in the daily "prayer meeting". In 1703, Christian Heinrich and King Frederick I of Prussia concluded the Treaty of Schönberg, in which Christian Heinrich ceded Brandenburg-Ansbach to Prussia in exchange for the Weferlingen district near Magdeburg.  The family then moved to Weferlingen Castle.

Life in Denmark
After her husband's death, her son-in-law, King Christian VI of Denmark, invited her to Denmark, which became a Pietist refuge.

Death
Sophie Christiane died on 23 August in 1737 and was buried in Roskilde Cathedral.

Issue 
Sophie Christiane from her marriage had 14 children:
 Georg Frederick Karl (b. Schloss Oberzulzbürg, 30 June 1688 – d. Bayreuth, 17 May 1735), who finally inherited Bayreuth in 1726.
 Albert Wolfgang (b. Schloss Obersulzbürg, 8 December 1689 – killed in action, near Parma, 29 June 1734).
 Dorothea Charlotte (b. Schloss Obersulzbürg, 15 March 1691 – d. Weikersheim, 18 March 1712); married on 7 August 1711 to Karl Ludwig, Count of Hohenlohe-Weikersheim.
 Frederick Emanuel (b. Schloss Obersulzbürg, 13 February 1692 – d. Schloss Obersulzbürg, 13 January 1693).
 Christiane Henriette (b. Schloss Obersulzbürg, 29 August 1693 – d. Schönberg, 19 May 1695).
 Frederick Wilhelm (b. Schönberg, 12 January 1695 – d. Schönberg, 13 May 1695).
 Christiane (b. and d. Schönberg, 31 October 1698).
 Christian August (b. Schönberg, 14 July 1699 – d. Schönberg, 29 July 1700).
 Sophie Magdalene (b. Schönberg, 28 November 1700 – d. Christiansborg Castle, 27 May 1770); married on 7 August 1721 to King Christian VI of Denmark.
 Christine Wilhelmine (b. Schönberg, 17 June 1702 – d. Schönberg, 19 March 1704).
 Frederick Ernest (b. Schönberg, 15 December 1703 – d. Schloss Friedrichsruhe in Drage, 23 June 1762); married on 26 December 1731 to Duchess Christine Sophie of Brunswick-Bevern. The union was childless.
 Marie Eleonore (b. Schönberg, 28 December 1704 – d. Schönberg, 4 June 1705).
 Sophie Caroline (b. Weferlingen, 31 March 1705 – d. Sorgenfri Castle, 7 June 1764); married on 8 December 1723 to George Albert, Prince of East Frisia.
 Frederick Christian (b. posthumously, Weferlingen, 17 July 1708 – d. Bayreuth, 20 January 1769), inherited Bayreuth in 1763.

|-

References 
 Horst Weigelt: Geschichte des Pietismus in Bayern, Vandenhoeck & Ruprecht, 2001, p. 226

Footnotes 

Margravines of Brandenburg-Bayreuth
German countesses
1667 births
1737 deaths
17th-century German people
18th-century German people
Burials at Roskilde Cathedral